Conservative Friends of Israel (CFI) is a British parliamentary group affiliated to the Conservative Party, which is dedicated to strengthening business, cultural and political ties between the United Kingdom and Israel, as well as between the British Conservative Party and the Israeli Likud party.

It was founded in 1974 by Michael Fidler, the Conservative MP for Bury and Radcliffe. The current Parliamentary Chairman is Stephen Crabb.

In 1995 Conservative politician Robert Rhodes James called it "the largest organisation in Western Europe dedicated to the cause of the people of Israel". By 2009, according to the Channel 4 documentary Dispatches – Inside Britain's Israel Lobby, around 80% of Conservative MPs were members of the CFI. In 2013, the Daily Telegraphs chief political commentator, Peter Oborne, called CFI "by far Britain's most powerful pro-Israel lobbying group."

Activities
The group's 2005 strategy identified the following areas of activity: supporting Israel, promoting the British Conservative Party, fighting terrorism, combating anti-semitism, and promoting peace in the Middle East. According to their website, "over two-thirds" of Conservative MPs were members of Conservative Friends of Israel in 2006. In 2007 the Political Director stated it had over 2,000 members and registered supporters. In 2009, at least half of the shadow cabinet were members of the group according to a Dispatches documentary.

Their website states the opinion that it is one of the fastest growing political lobby groups in the UK. According to the Dispatches documentary, between 2006 and 2009 the CFI funded more than 30 Conservative parliamentary candidates to visit Israel.

In 2012 CFI reconstituted itself as a private company limited by guarantee.

CFI annual business lunch
On 30 January 2006, David Cameron, then newly elected Conservative leader, addressed the CFI annual business lunch whose audience included half of the Conservative Parliamentary Party. As part of his speech, he stated "I am proud not just to be a Conservative, but a Conservative friend of Israel; and I am proud of the key role CFI plays within our Party. Israel is a democracy, a strong and proud democracy, in a region that is, we hope, making its first steps in that direction."

Former Conservative party leaders Iain Duncan Smith and Michael Howard have addressed the CFI lunch.

The British Pakistani MP Sajid Javid has also made business launch speeches which have been positively received by the CFI, with The Jewish Chronicle even reporting Javid as a future Prime Minister.

Donations
The Dispatches documentary claimed members of the group and their companies have donated over £10 million to the Conservative party between 2001 and 2009. The group called this figure "deeply flawed" saying that they have only donated £30,000 between 2004 and 2009 but that members of the group have undoubtedly made their own donations to the party. Dispatches described the CFI as "beyond doubt the most well-connected and probably the best funded of all Westminster lobbying groups".

Members of CFI

In 2014, CFI stated that 80% of Conservative MPs were members.

In alphabetical order, members of Conservative Friends of Israel include:

Lord Arbuthnot of Edrom
Graham Brady MP
Alistair Burt MP
David Cameron
James Clappison
Stephen Crabb MP – CFI's Parliamentary Chairman in the House of Commons, 2017
Steve Double
Iain Duncan-Smith MP
Lord Hague of Richmond
Robert Halfon MP
Lord Harrington
Lord Kalms
Sajid Javid MP
Priti Patel MP
Lord Pickles – CFI's Parliamentary Chairman in the House of Lords
Sir Malcolm Rifkind
Sheryll Murray
Theresa Villiers, MP
Philip Hollobone MP

See also

Israel lobby in the United Kingdom
Labour Friends of Israel
Labour Friends of Palestine & the Middle East
Liberal Democrat Friends of Israel
Northern Ireland Friends of Israel
European Friends of Israel
Friends of Israel Initiative
Conservative Friends of Russia
Conservative Friends of the Chinese

References

External links
Conservative Friends of Israel – Official site

Israel friendship associations
Political advocacy groups in the United Kingdom
Organisations associated with the Conservative Party (UK)
Israel–United Kingdom relations
United Kingdom friendship associations
Jewish British history
Lobbying in the United Kingdom